Jerlani Robinson (born 23 December 1993) is a Dominican cricketer who plays for the Windward Islands in West Indian domestic cricket. A right-handed top-order batsman, Robinson made his first-class debut for the Windwards in March 2015, playing against Guyana in the 2014–15 Regional Four Day Competition. He scored his maiden first-class half-century in February 2016, with an innings of 57 in the first innings of a match against Guyana. He followed this was 64 runs in the second innings of the next match, against Jamaica.

His grandfather Clem John played for Windward Islands in the 1960s.

References

External links
Player profile and statistics at CricketArchive
Player profile and statistics at ESPNcricinfo

1993 births
Living people
Dominica cricketers
Windward Islands cricketers